Lucky: How Joe Biden Barely Won the Presidency is a non-fiction book by Jonathan Allen and Amie Parnes, journalists for NBC News and The Hill, respectively. The book is about Joe Biden's successful campaign in the 2020 United States presidential election. Allen and Parnes had previously written Shattered: Inside Hillary Clinton's Doomed Campaign, a book about Hillary Clinton's unsuccessful campaign in the 2016 United States presidential election.

Content 
Lucky describes how, according to Allen and Parnes, Joe Biden "barely won the presidency". They describe conflicting ideas among Biden's campaign staff about political strategy, rhetoric, and policy. The book covers the campaign's response to matters such as the COVID-19 pandemic and ongoing racial unrest. The Biden campaign's navigation of the COVID-19 pandemic is given as one major reason for electoral success. It examines interactions between key Democratic Party figures and the campaign, such as Barack Obama, Hillary Clinton and Andrew Cuomo.

References

2021 non-fiction books
Books about Joe Biden
Joe Biden 2020 presidential campaign
Crown Publishing Group books
American political books
Collaborative non-fiction books
Non-fiction books about elections